Mansfield Timberview High School (THS) is a secondary school located in Arlington, Texas, United States. It is a Mansfield Independent School District campus. Its mascot is the wolf. Timberview High School was named an AVID National Demonstration School in 2016 and an AVID School-wide Site of Distinction in 2017. The school serves sections of Arlington, Mansfield, and Grand Prairie. Timberview serves several communities, including Lake Port Village.

History 
On October 6, 2021, a shooter (Timothy George Simpkins) opened fire just after 9:15 a.m., shooting three people, including a student attending Mansfield Timberview High School, who was left in critical condition. The shooter identified as an 18-year-old male named Timothy George Simpkins fled after the shooting. The suspect fled the scene and later turned himself in that day. The suspect faces three counts of assault with a deadly weapon. This prompted authorities to monitor videofeeds in real time and conduct random canine searches in classrooms.

Feeder patterns
The following elementary schools feed into Mansfield Timberview High School: Brockett, Gideon, Thelma Jones, and Cabaniss.

Icenhower intermediate school feeds into Mansfield Timberview High School. Coble middle school feeds into Mansfield Timberview High School.

Athletics
State titles:
(2008-2009) Girls' Track
(2009-2010) Girls' Basketball
(2016-2017) Men's Basketball
(2018-2019) Men's Basketball

Notable alumni
David Anenih, 2017, American football player
Michael Choice, 2007, baseball player
Marcus Cromartie, 2008, football player
Aldrich Bailey, 2012, track and field sprinter for the Texas A&M Aggies
Alex Robinson, 2014, basketball player for the TCU Horned Frogs
Chennedy Carter, 2017, professional basketball player who also played for Texas A&M
Isaac Likekele, 2018, college basketball player
Jalen Jones (born 1993), basketball player for Hapoel Haifa in the Israeli Basketball Premier League
Kaash Paige, 2019, Dallas singer and songwriter signed to Def Jam Recordings

References

External links
 

Educational institutions established in 2004
2004 establishments in Texas
High schools in Arlington, Texas
Mansfield Independent School District high schools
Public high schools in Tarrant County, Texas